Jazz at Massey Hall is a live jazz album featuring a performance by "The Quintet" given on 15 May 1953 at Massey Hall in Toronto, Ontario, Canada.  The quintet was composed of five leading 'modern' players of the day: Dizzy Gillespie, Charlie Parker, Bud Powell, Charles Mingus, and Max Roach. It was the only time that the five musicians recorded together as a unit, and it was the last recorded meeting of Parker and Gillespie.

Background
The first pianist considered by the organizers was Lennie Tristano, but he suggested Powell as a more appropriate match for the other musicians. Oscar Pettiford was considered as an alternative to Mingus.

The concert
Parker played a Grafton saxophone on this date; he could not be listed on the original album cover for contractual reasons, so was billed as "Charlie Chan", an allusion to the fictional detective and to Parker's wife Chan.

The original plan was for the Toronto New Jazz Society and the musicians to share the profits from the concert. However, owing to a boxing prize fight between Rocky Marciano and Jersey Joe Walcott taking place simultaneously, the audience was so small that the Society was unable to pay the musicians' fees. The musicians were all given NSF checks, and only Parker was able to cash his; Gillespie noted that he did not receive his fee "for years and years".

Album releases
The record was originally issued in 1953 on Mingus's label Debut, from a recording made by the Toronto New Jazz Society (Dick Wattam, Alan Scharf, Roger Feather, Boyd Raeburn and Arthur Granatstein). Mingus took the recording to New York where he and Max Roach dubbed in the bass lines, which were under-recorded on most of the tunes, and exchanged Mingus soloing on "All the Things You Are".

A 2002 reissue, Complete Jazz at Massey Hall, released on The Jazz Factory label, contains the full concert, without the overdubbing.

Jazz at Massey Hall was inducted into the Grammy Hall of Fame in 1995. It is included in National Public Radio's "Basic Jazz Library". The Penguin Guide to Jazz Recordings included the album in its suggested “core collection” of essential recordings. The concert was issued in some territories under the tag "the greatest jazz concert ever".

Track listing
(Originally issued as two 10" LPs:)

Vol. 1 (Debut DLP-2)
 "Perdido" (Juan Tizol) – 7:43
 "Salt Peanuts" (Dizzy Gillespie, Kenny Clarke) – 7:39
 "All the Things You Are" (Jerome Kern)/"52nd Street Theme" (Thelonious Monk) – 7:52

Vol. 3 (Debut DLP-4)
 "Wee (Allen's Alley)" (Denzil Best) – 6:41
 "Hot House" (Tadd Dameron) – 9:11
 "A Night in Tunisia" (Gillespie, Frank Paparelli) – 7:34

(Vol. 2 consists of the trio recordings of Powell, Mingus and Roach from the same date: all but "I've Got You Under My Skin", and one track by Billy Taylor with Mingus and Roach from a later date.)

(Issued as 12" LP:)

(Debut DEB-124)
 "Perdido" (Juan Tizol)
 "Salt Peanuts" (Dizzy Gillespie, Kenny Clarke)
 "All the Things You Are" (Jerome Kern)
 "52nd Street Theme" (Thelonious Monk)
 "Wee (Allen's Alley)" (Denzil Best)
 "Hot House" (Tadd Dameron)
 "A Night in Tunisia" (Gillespie, Frank Paparelli)

(The 2004 reissue contains fourteen tracks, of which nos. 5 through 11 are without Parker and Gillespie:)
 "Perdido" (Juan Tizol)
 "Salt Peanuts" (Dizzy Gillespie, Kenny Clarke)
 "All the Things You Are" (Jerome Kern)
 "52nd Street Theme" (Thelonious Monk)
 "Drum Conversation" (Max Roach)
 "Cherokee" (Ray Noble)
 "Embraceable You" (George Gershwin)
 "Hallelujah (Jubilee)" (Vincent Youmans)
 "Sure Thing" (Bud Powell)
 "Lullaby of Birdland" (George Shearing)
 "I've Got You Under My Skin" (Cole Porter)
 "Wee (Allen's Alley)" (Denzil Best)
 "Hot House" (Tadd Dameron)
 "A Night in Tunisia" (Gillespie, Frank Paparelli)

Tracks 5 through 11 are without Parker and Gillespie.

Personnel
Dizzy Gillespie – trumpet, vocal on "Salt Peanuts"
Charles Mingus – bass
Charlie Parker – alto sax
Bud Powell – piano
Max Roach – drums

An album of a trio set played by Powell, Mingus and Roach at the concert was also issued (tracks 6 through 11 above).

References

Other sources
Mark Miller. Cool Blues: Charlie Parker in Canada 1953. London, Ontario: Nightwood Editions, 1989. (contains the definitive account of the concert events)  
Richard Cook and Brian Morton. The Penguin Guide to Jazz on CD 6th edition. , 2008.
Geoffrey Haydon "Quintet of the Year", Aurum Press, London, 2002.

External links 
50th Anniversary of Jazz at Massey Hall celebration

1953 live albums
Albums produced by Charles Mingus
Albums recorded at Massey Hall
America Records albums
America Records live albums
Debut Records live albums
Original Jazz Classics albums
Bud Powell albums
Charles Mingus live albums
Charlie Parker albums
Dizzy Gillespie live albums
Max Roach live albums
Live album series
Grammy Hall of Fame Award recipients
Music of Toronto